Jonovision was a Canadian television talk show aimed toward teenagers. The show aired for five seasons, from 1996 to 2001, on CBC Television. Jonovision was nominated for 4 Gemini Awards. It reached the top of its popularity at the beginning of its fourth season, when it hosted a Degrassi reunion. The host was Jonathan Torrens, who later went on to play J-Roc in Trailer Park Boys.

Jonovision hosted one of the first television appearances of Sum 41, as part of an indie music showcase entitled Jonopalooza.

External links

References

1996 Canadian television series debuts
2001 Canadian television series endings
CBC Kids original programming
Television shows filmed in Toronto
1990s Canadian children's television series
2000s Canadian children's television series
1990s Canadian television talk shows
2000s Canadian television talk shows